Tsutomu Yamazaki 山崎 力 (8 May 1947in Aomori  – 2 June 2021 in Aomori) was a Japanese politician. He was a member of the House of Councillors from 1995 until 2007 and again from 2010 until 2016. Yamazaki was born in Aomori, Japan.

Yamazaki died from COVID-19 at a hospital in Aomori on 2 June 2021, aged 74.

References

1947 births
2021 deaths
Japanese politicians
People from Aomori (city)
Members of the House of Councillors (Japan)
Deaths from the COVID-19 pandemic in Japan